Green Holm, (HU382379), is a small uninhabited island 500 metres north of Burra Ness at the north end of the island of Burra and on the west side of the main shipping lane into Scalloway, in Shetland.

Uninhabited islands of Shetland
Underwater diving sites in Scotland